John Towner Williams KBE (born February 8, 1932) is an American composer, conductor, and pianist. In a career that has spanned seven decades, he has composed some of the most popular, recognizable and critically acclaimed film scores in cinematic history. Williams has won 25 Grammy Awards, five Academy Awards, seven British Academy Film Awards, and four Golden Globe Awards. With 53 Academy Award nominations, he is the second most-nominated individual, after Walt Disney. His compositions are considered the epitome of film music, and he is considered among the greatest composers in the history of cinema.

Williams has been associated with director Steven Spielberg since 1974, composing music for all but five of his feature films, and George Lucas, with whom he has worked on both of his main franchises. His early work as a film composer includes The Killers (1964), How to Steal a Million (1966), Valley of the Dolls (1967), and Goodbye Mr. Chips (1969). He has received five Academy Awards for Best Original Score for his work on Fiddler on the Roof (1971), Jaws (1975), E.T.: The Extra Terrestrial (1982), Star Wars (1977), and Schindler's List (1993). Williams has composed for many popular films including the Star Wars saga, Superman, the first two Home Alone films, the Indiana Jones films, the first two Jurassic Park films, and the first three Harry Potter films. Other films memorable scores from his collaboration with Spielberg include Close Encounters of the Third Kind (1977), Hook (1991), Saving Private Ryan (1998), Catch Me If You Can (2002), War Horse (2011), Lincoln (2012), and The Fabelmans (2022). 

Williams has also composed numerous classical concertos and other works for orchestral ensembles and solo instruments. He served as the Boston Pops' principal conductor from 1980 to 1993 and is its laureate conductor. Other works by Williams include theme music for the 1984 Summer Olympic Games, NBC Sunday Night Football, "The Mission" theme used by NBC News and Seven News in Australia, the television series Lost in Space and Land of the Giants, and the incidental music for the first season of Gilligan's Island. Williams announced but then rescinded his intention to retire from film score composing after the release of Indiana Jones and the Dial of Destiny in 2023.

In 2005, the American Film Institute selected Williams's score to 1977's Star Wars as the greatest film score of all time. The Library of Congress entered the Star Wars soundtrack into the National Recording Registry for being "culturally, historically, or aesthetically significant". Williams was inducted into the Hollywood Bowl's Hall of Fame in 2000, and he received a Kennedy Center Honor in 2004. His AFI Life Achievement Award in 2016 was the first to be awarded outside of the acting and directing fields. He has composed the score for nine of the top 25 highest-grossing films at the U.S. box office (adjusted for inflation). His work has influenced other composers of film, popular, and contemporary classical music.

Early life and family
John Towner Williams was born in Flushing, Queens, New York City, to Esther (née Towner) and Johnny Williams, a jazz drummer and percussionist who played with the Raymond Scott Quintet. He is the eldest of four children and has three younger siblings: Jerry, Joan, and Donald. Williams said of his lineage: "My father was a Maine man—we were very close. My mother was from Boston. My father's parents ran a department store in Bangor, Maine, and my mother's father was a cabinetmaker."

In 1948, the Williams family moved to Los Angeles where John attended North Hollywood High School, graduating in 1950. He later attended the University of California, Los Angeles, and studied composition privately with the Italian composer Mario Castelnuovo-Tedesco. Williams also attended Los Angeles City College for one semester, as the school had a Studio Jazz Band. In 1951, Williams joined the U.S. Air Force, where he played the piano and brass and conducted and arranged music for the U.S. Air Force Band as part of his assignments. In a 2016 interview with the U.S. Air Force Band, he recounted having attended basic training at Lackland Air Force Base, after which he served as a pianist and brass player, with secondary duties of making arrangements for three years. He also attended music courses at the University of Arizona as part of his service.

In 1955, following his Air Force service, Williams moved to New York City and entered the Juilliard School, where he studied piano with Rosina Lhévinne. He was originally set on becoming a concert pianist, but after hearing contemporary pianists like John Browning and Van Cliburn perform he switched his focus to composition. During this time Williams worked as a jazz pianist in the city's many jazz clubs.

Early career
After his studies at Juilliard and the Eastman School of Music, Williams returned to Los Angeles where he began working as an orchestrator at film studios. Among other composers, Williams worked with Franz Waxman, Bernard Herrmann, and Alfred Newman, and also with his fellow orchestrators Conrad Salinger and Bob Franklyn.

Williams was also a studio pianist and session musician, performing on film scores by composers such as Jerry Goldsmith, Elmer Bernstein, Leonard Bernstein, and Henry Mancini. With Mancini he recorded the scores of 1959's Peter Gunn, 1962's Days of Wine and Roses, and 1963's Charade. With Elmer Bernstein, he performed on the score of Hecht-Hill-Lancaster's Sweet Smell of Success. Williams plays the piano part of the guitar-piano ostinato in the famous Mancini Peter Gunn title theme. On the Peter Gunn soundtrack, he collaborated with guitarist Bob Bain, bassist Rolly Bundock, and drummer Jack Sperling, many of whom were also featured on the Mr. Lucky television series. Williams was the pianist for the soundtrack for the adaptation of Leonard Bernstein's West Side Story and the 1960 film The Apartment.

Williams during this time period was known as Johnny Williams, and under this name he released several jazz albums, including World on a String and The John Towner Touch. Williams also served as music arranger and bandleader for a series of popular music albums with the singers Ray Vasquez and Frankie Laine.

Film and television scoring

Although skilled in a variety of 20th-century compositional idioms, Williams's most familiar style may be described as a form of neoromanticism, which was inspired by the late 19th century's large-scale orchestral music—in the style of Pyotr Ilyich Tchaikovsky or Richard Wagner and their concept of leitmotif—that inspired his film music predecessors.

Williams's first film composition was for You Are Welcome—a promotional film for the tourist information office of Newfoundland, created in 1954 when Williams was stationed at Pepperrell Air Force Base.  Williams's first feature film composition was in 1958 for the B movie Daddy-O, and his first screen credit came two years later in Because They're Young. Williams also composed music for various television programs in the same time period including the pilot episode of Gilligan's Island, Bachelor Father (1959–60), the Kraft Suspense Theatre, Lost in Space (1965–68), The Time Tunnel (1966–67), and Land of the Giants (the last three created by the prolific TV producer Irwin Allen). He also worked on several episodes of M Squad.

He soon gained notice in Hollywood for his versatility in composing jazz, piano, and symphonic music. Williams received his first Academy Award nomination for his score for 1967's Valley of the Dolls and was nominated again for his score for 1969's Goodbye, Mr. Chips. He won his first Academy Award for his score adaptation for the 1971 film Fiddler on the Roof. In 1972, he composed the score for the Robert Altman-directed psychological thriller Images (recorded in collaboration with noted percussionist Stomu Yamashta), which earned him another nomination in the category Best Music, Original Dramatic Score at the 1973 Academy Awards. Williams's prominence grew in the early 1970s thanks to his work for Irwin Allen's "disaster films." He wrote the scores for 1972's The Poseidon Adventure and 1974's The Towering Inferno. He scored Universal's 1974 film Earthquake for director Mark Robson, completing a "trinity" of scores for the decade's highest-grossing "disaster films", and the 1972 film The Cowboys, a western starring John Wayne and directed by Mark Rydell.

In 1974, director Steven Spielberg approached Williams to compose the music for his feature directorial debut, The Sugarland Express. They teamed up again a year later for Spielberg's second film, Jaws. Widely considered a classic suspense film, its score's ominous two-note ostinato has become synonymous with sharks and approaching danger. The score earned Williams his second Academy Award. Shortly thereafter, Spielberg and Williams began collaborating on Spielberg's next feature film, Close Encounters of the Third Kind. During the two-year collaboration, they crafted its distinctive five-note figure that functions both in the background music and as the communications signal of the film's extraterrestrials. Williams also used a system of musical hand signals in the film that were based on hand signs created by John Curwen and refined by Zoltán Kodály. In 1975 Clint Eastwood chose Williams to score his classic climbing film The Eiger Sanction.

During the same period, Spielberg recommended Williams to his friend and fellow director George Lucas, who needed a composer to score his ambitious 1977 space epic film Star Wars. Williams eventually delivered a grand symphonic score in the fashion of Gustav Holst's orchestral suite The Planets, as well as Richard Strauss, Antonín Dvořák, and Golden Age Hollywood composers Max Steiner and Erich Wolfgang Korngold. The Star Wars theme is among the most widely recognized in film history, and the "Force Theme" and "Princess Leia's Theme" are well-known examples of leitmotif. Both the film and its score were immensely successful—it remains the highest grossing non-popular music recording of all time—and Williams won another Academy Award for Best Original Score. In 1980, Williams returned to score The Empire Strikes Back, introducing "The Imperial March" as the theme for Darth Vader and the Galactic Empire, "Yoda's Theme", and "Han Solo and the Princess". The original Star Wars trilogy concluded with the 1983 film Return of the Jedi, for which Williams's score provided most notably the "Emperor's Theme", "Parade of the Ewoks", and "Luke and Leia". Both scores earned him Academy Award nominations.

Williams scored the 1976 Alfred Hitchcock film Family Plot. Williams did not much like the film but did not want to turn down the chance to work for Hitchcock. Hitchcock merely told him to remember one thing, "Murder can be fun." Hitchcock was very satisfied with the result. Williams worked with director Richard Donner to score the 1978 film Superman. The score's heroic and romantic themes, particularly the main march, the Superman fanfare and the love theme, known as "Can You Read My Mind", appeared in the four sequel films.

For the 1981 film Raiders of the Lost Ark, created by Lucas and directed by Spielberg, Williams wrote a rousing main theme known as "The Raiders March" to accompany the film's hero, Indiana Jones. He composed separate themes to represent the Ark of the Covenant, the character Marion, and the story's Nazi villains. Additional themes were featured in his scores to the subsequent Indiana Jones and the Temple of Doom (1984), Indiana Jones and the Last Crusade (1989), and Indiana Jones and the Kingdom of the Crystal Skull (2008). Williams composed an emotional and sensitive score to Spielberg's 1982 fantasy film E.T. the Extra-Terrestrial, for which he was awarded a fourth Academy Award.

In 1985, Williams was commissioned by NBC to compose a television news music package for various network news spots. The package, which Williams named "The Mission", consists of four movements, two of which are still used heavily by NBC today for Today, NBC Nightly News, and Meet the Press.

The Spielberg–Williams collaboration resumed with the 1987 film Empire of the Sun and still continues, spanning genres from science fiction thrillers (1993's Jurassic Park) to somber tragedies 2005's Munich to Eastern-tinged melodramas (2005's Memoirs of a Geisha, directed by Rob Marshall) to dramatic war films (1998's Saving Private Ryan). Spielberg has said, "I call it an honorable privilege to regard John Williams as a friend." In his Academy Award-nominated score for The Accidental Tourist (1988), Williams developed the two main theme sections in different ways, turning the mood lighter or darker through orchestration and an unexpected use of synthesizers. 1993's Schindler's List proved to be a challenge for Williams, and after viewing the rough cut with Spielberg, he was hesitant to score the film, being so overcome with emotion watching the cut. He told Spielberg, "I really think you need a better composer than I am for this film." Spielberg then replied, "I know, but they're all dead." Williams enlisted the help of classical violinist Itzhak Perlman to play the main theme for the film. Williams then garnered his fourth Oscar for Best Original Score, his fifth Academy Award overall.

In 1999, Lucas launched the first of three prequels to the original Star Wars trilogy. Williams was asked to score all three, starting with The Phantom Menace. Along with themes from the previous films, Williams created new themes to be used as leitmotifs in 2002's Attack of the Clones and 2005's Revenge of the Sith. Most notable of these was "Duel of the Fates," an aggressive choral composition in the style of Verdi's Requiem, utilizing harsh Sanskrit lyrics that broadened the style of music used in the Star Wars films. It used vocal melodies instead of his usual compositions using brass instruments. Also of note was "Anakin's Theme", which begins as an innocent childlike melody and morphs insidiously into a quote of the sinister "Imperial March". For Episode II Williams composed "Across the Stars", a love theme for Padmé Amidala and Anakin Skywalker (mirroring the love theme composed for The Empire Strikes Back). The final installment combined many of the themes created for the series' previous films, including "The Emperor's Theme", "The Imperial March", "Across the Stars", "Duel of the Fates", "The Force Theme", "Rebel Fanfare", "Luke's Theme", and "Princess Leia's Theme", as well as new themes for General Grievous and the film's climax, titled "Battle of the Heroes".

In the 2000s, Williams scored the first three film adaptations of J. K. Rowling's widely successful book series Harry Potter. As with his Superman theme, the most important theme from Williams's scores for the Harry Potter films, "Hedwig's Theme", was used in the fourth through eighth films (Harry Potter and the Goblet of Fire, Harry Potter and the Order of the Phoenix, Harry Potter and the Half-Blood Prince, Harry Potter and the Deathly Hallows – Part 1, and Harry Potter and the Deathly Hallows – Part 2), scored by Patrick Doyle (Goblet of Fire), Nicholas Hooper (Order of the Phoenix and Half-Blood Prince) and Alexandre Desplat (Deathly Hallows). Like the main themes from Jaws, Star Wars, Superman, and Indiana Jones, fans have come to identify the Harry Potter films with Williams's original compositions. Williams was asked to return to score the film franchise's final installment, Harry Potter and the Deathly Hallows – Part 2, but director David Yates said that "their schedules simply did not align", as he would have had to provide Williams with a rough cut of the film sooner than was possible.

In 2002, for the 20th anniversary edition of E.T. the Extra-Terrestrial, Williams composed a score for the Universal Pictures logo that segued to music from the movie. In 2006, Superman Returns was directed by Bryan Singer, best known for directing the first two films in the X-Men series. Singer did not request Williams to compose a score for the intentionally Donner-esque film, but he employed the skills of X2 composer John Ottman to incorporate Williams's original Superman theme as well as those for Lois Lane, Krypton and Smallville. In 2011, the "Main Title Theme" and elements of "Can You Read My Mind" were used in the final scene of "Finale", the series finale of The WB/CW television series Smallville. Don Davis, recommended by Williams to the producers, performed a similar role for Jurassic Park III. In 2008 Williams composed music for two documentaries, Warner at War and A Timeless Call, the latter directed by Spielberg. In 2011, after a three-year absence from film scoring, Williams composed the scores for Spielberg's The Adventures of Tintin and War Horse. Both scores received overwhelmingly positive reviews and earned Academy Award nominations, the latter also being nominated for a Golden Globe. The Oscar nominations were Williams's 46th and 47th, making him the most nominated musician in Academy Award history (having previously been tied with Alfred Newman's 45 nominations), and the second most nominated overall, behind Walt Disney. Williams won an Annie Award for his score for The Adventures of Tintin. In 2012, he scored Spielberg's film Lincoln and subsequently received his 48th Academy Award nomination.

In February 2013, Williams expressed interest in working on the Star Wars sequel trilogy, saying: "Now we're hearing of a new set of movies coming in 2015, 2016... so I need to make sure I'm still ready to go in a few years for what I hope would be continued work with George." He also scored the 2013 film The Book Thief, his first collaboration with a director other than Spielberg since 2005. The score earned him an Academy Award, Golden Globe and BAFTA nominations and a Grammy Award for Best Instrumental Composition. It was his 44th nomination for Best Original Score (and 49th overall), setting a new record for the most nominations in that category (he tied Alfred Newman's record of 43 nominations in 2013). In 2015, Williams scored Star Wars: The Force Awakens, earning him his 50th Academy Award nomination. He was also set to write the score for Bridge of Spies that year, which would have been his 27th collaboration with Spielberg, but in March 2015 it was announced that Thomas Newman would score it instead, as Williams's schedule was interrupted by a minor health issue. This was the first Spielberg film since The Color Purple (1985) not scored by Williams. In 2016, Williams composed the score for Spielberg's The BFG. In 2017, Williams scored the animated short film Dear Basketball, directed by Glen Keane and based on a poem by Kobe Bryant. He also wrote the music for Star Wars: The Last Jedi, the eighth episode of the saga, and Spielberg's drama film The Post, both of which opened in December 2017. Williams contributed "The Adventures of Han" and several additional demos for the 2018 standalone Star Wars film Solo: A Star Wars Story, while John Powell wrote the film's original score and adapted Williams's music.

In March 2018, Williams announced that following Star Wars: The Rise of Skywalker, which was released in December 2019, he would retire from composing music for the Star Wars franchise: "We know J. J. Abrams is preparing one Star Wars movie now that I will hopefully do next year for him. I look forward to it. It will round out a series of nine, that will be quite enough for me." Williams makes a cameo in the film as Oma Tres, a Kijimi bartender. In July 2018, Williams composed the main musical theme for Disneyland and Disney's Hollywood Studios theme park attraction Star Wars: Galaxy's Edge. William Ross, who conducted the symphonic recording of the theme with the London Symphony Orchestra on Williams's behalf, additionally arranged Williams's original composition in different musical contexts for use, recording nearly an hour of musical material at Abbey Road Studios in November 2018. Williams won the Grammy Award for Best Instrumental Composition for his Star Wars: Galaxy's Edge Symphonic Suite.

In 2019, Williams served as music consultant for Spielberg's 2021 film adaptation of West Side Story. Williams scored Spielberg's next film The Fabelmans, released on November 23, 2022. He also composed the theme music for the Star Wars miniseries Obi-Wan Kenobi. In June 2022, Williams announced that Indiana Jones and the Dial of Destiny, scheduled for a 2023 release, would likely be his last film score as he plans to retire from film and focus on composing concert music. However, he reversed this decision by January 2023, stating that he had at least "10 more years to go. I'll stick around for a while!". He compared the decision to Spielberg's father Arnold, who had worked in his career field until he was 100.

Conducting, performing, and other classical works

From 1980 to 1993, Williams served as the Boston Pops Orchestra's principal conductor, succeeding Arthur Fiedler. Williams never met Fiedler in person but spoke to him by telephone. His arrival as the Pops' new leader in the spring of 1980 allowed him to devote part of the Pops' first PBS broadcast of the season to presenting his new compositions for The Empire Strikes Back. Williams almost ended his tenure with the Pops in 1984 when some players hissed while sight-reading a new Williams composition in rehearsal; Williams abruptly left the session and tendered his resignation. He initially cited mounting conflicts with his film composing schedule but later admitted a perceived lack of discipline in, and respect from, the Pops' ranks, culminating in this latest instance. After entreaties by the management and personal apologies from the musicians, Williams withdrew his resignation and continued as principal conductor for nine more years. In 1995, he was succeeded by Keith Lockhart, the former associate conductor of the Cincinnati Symphony Orchestra and Cincinnati Pops Orchestra. Williams is now the Pops' laureate conductor, thus maintaining his affiliation with its parent Boston Symphony Orchestra. Williams leads the Pops on several occasions each year, particularly during their Holiday Pops season and typically for a week of concerts in May. He conducts an annual Film Night at both Boston Symphony Hall and Tanglewood, where he frequently enlists the Tanglewood Festival Chorus.

Williams has written many concert pieces, including a symphony; a concerto for horn written for Dale Clevenger, the Chicago Symphony Orchestra's principal horn; a concerto for clarinet written for Michele Zukovsky, the Los Angeles Philharmonic's principal clarinetist, in 1991; a sinfonietta for wind ensemble; a cello concerto premiered by Yo-Yo Ma and the Boston Symphony Orchestra at Tanglewood in 1994; concertos for the flute and violin recorded by the London Symphony Orchestra; and a trumpet concerto, which was premiered by The Cleveland Orchestra and their principal trumpet Michael Sachs in September 1996. His bassoon concerto, "The Five Sacred Trees", which was premiered by the New York Philharmonic and principal bassoon player Judith LeClair in 1995, was recorded for Sony Classical by Williams with LeClair and the London Symphony Orchestra. Williams was the subject of an hour-long documentary for the BBC in 1980, and was featured in a report on 20/20 in 1983.

He composed the "Liberty Fanfare" for the Statue of Liberty's rededication; "We're Lookin' Good!" for the Special Olympics in celebration of the 1987 International Summer Games; and themes for the 1984, 1988, 1996, and 2002 Olympic Games. One of his concert works, "Seven for Luck", for soprano and orchestra, is a seven-piece song cycle based on the texts of former U.S. poet laureate Rita Dove. "Seven for Luck" had its world premiere by the Boston Symphony under Williams with soprano Cynthia Haymon.

Williams makes annual appearances with the Los Angeles Philharmonic at the Hollywood Bowl, and he took part as conductor and composer in the orchestra's opening gala concerts for the Walt Disney Concert Hall in 2003. In 2004, he both served as the Grand Marshal for the Rose Parade, and directed "The Star Spangled Banner" at the Rose Bowl. In April 2005, Williams and the Boston Pops performed the "Throne Room Finale" from Star Wars at opening day in Fenway Park as the Boston Red Sox, having won their first World Series championship since 1918, received their championship rings. For Game 1 of the 2007 World Series, Williams conducted a brass-and-drum ensemble in a new dissonant arrangement of the "Star Spangled Banner".

In February 2004, April 2006, and September 2007, Williams conducted the New York Philharmonic at Avery Fisher Hall in New York City. The initial program was intended to be a one-time special event, and featured Williams's medley of Oscar-winning film scores first performed at the previous year's Academy Awards. Its unprecedented popularity led to two concerts in 2006: fundraising gala events featuring personal recollections by film directors Martin Scorsese and Steven Spielberg. Continuing demand fueled three more concerts in 2007, which all sold out. These featured a tribute to the musicals of film director Stanley Donen and had the distinction of serving as the New York Philharmonic season's opening event. After a three-season absence, Williams conducted the Philharmonic once again in October 2011.

Maestro Williams also conducted the National Symphony Orchestra, the U.S. Army Herald Trumpets, the Joint Armed Forces Chorus, and the Choral Arts Society of Washington in his new arrangement of "The Star-Spangled Banner" for the anthem's 200th anniversary. The performance was held at A Capitol Fourth, an Independence Day celebration concert in Washington, D.C., on July 4, 2014. On April 13, 2017, at Star Wars Celebration Orlando, Williams performed a surprise concert with the Orlando Philharmonic Orchestra featuring "Princess Leia's Theme" (a tribute to the recently deceased Carrie Fisher), "The Imperial March" and "Main Title", followed by Lucas saying, "The secret sauce of Star Wars, the greatest composer-conductor in the universe, John Williams".

German classical violinist Anne-Sophie Mutter and Williams, introduced to each other by their mutual friend André Previn, collaborated on an album, "Across the Stars", on which Mutter played themes and pieces from Williams's film scores in his new arrangements for violin. It was released in August 2019. The Vienna Philharmonic Orchestra invited Williams to lead concerts in January 2020, his first engagement with a European orchestra, for an all-Williams concert featuring Mutter as soloist. The concert included many pieces from the" Across the Stars" Album. The resulting concert album, "John Williams in Vienna", became the best-selling orchestral album of 2020, reaching the top 10 in many countries and topping the U.S. and UK classical charts. The orchestra also commissioned a new procedural from Williams for their annual Philharmonikerball, replacing the 1924 fanfare by Richard Strauss. Williams conducted the Berlin Philharmonic from October 14-16th, 2021, marking his second engagement with a European orchestra and his first with the Berlin Philharmonic. In 2022, in celebration of his 90th birthday, Williams conducted the Vienna Philharmonic in March, and was honored on August 20 with a tribute at Tanglewood. The tribute at Tanglewood featured musicians James Taylor, Yo-Yo Ma, and Branford Marsalis. The Boston Symphony Orchestra performed some of Williams' most well-known music, with Williams conducting the "Raiders March" from the Indiana Jones movies at the end of the show.

Personal life
In 1956, Williams married Barbara Ruick, an American actress and singer, and remained married until her death in 1974. They had three children: Jennifer (Jenny) Williams Gruska (b. 1956), Mark Towner Williams (b. 1958), and Joseph Williams (b. 1960); the latter is best known as the lead singer of Toto. In 1980, Williams married Samantha Winslow, a photographer.

Honors

Williams is regarded as one of the most influential film composers. His work has influenced other film composers, as well as contemporary classical and popular music. Similarly, his film music has clear influences from other classical and film composers, including Holst, Stravinsky, Korngold, and others. But while many have specifically referenced the similarities, these are generally attributed to the natural influence of one composer on another.

Williams has been nominated for 53 Academy Awards, winning five; six Emmy Awards, winning three; 25 Golden Globe Awards, winning four; 71 Grammy Awards, winning 25; and has received seven British Academy Film Awards. With 53 Oscar nominations, Williams currently holds the record for the most Oscar nominations for a living person and is the second most nominated person in Academy Awards history behind Walt Disney's 59. Williams is the only person to be nominated for an Academy Award in seven different decades (the 1960s, 70s, 80s, 90s, 2000s, 2010s, and 2020s). He is also the oldest person, at age 90, ever to be nominated for an Academy Award. Forty-eight of Williams's Oscar nominations are for Best Original Score and five are for Best Original Song. He won four Oscars for Best Original Score and one for Best Scoring: Adaptation and Original Song Score (Fiddler on the Roof).

He has received several academic honors. In 1980, Williams received an Honorary Doctorate of Music from Berklee College of Music. Williams received an Honorary Doctor of Music degree from Boston College in 1993, from Harvard University in 2017, and from the University of Pennsylvania in 2021. Williams was made an honorary brother of Kappa Kappa Psi at Boston University in 1993, upon his impending retirement from the Boston Pops. Since 1988, Williams has been honored with 15 Sammy Film Music Awards, the longest-running awards for film music recordings. In 2000, Williams received the Golden Plate Award of the American Academy of Achievement.

Williams has been inducted into the American Classical Music Hall of Fame and the Hollywood Bowl Hall of Fame. Williams was honored with the annual Richard Kirk award at the 1999 BMI Film and TV Awards, recognizing his contribution to film and television music. In 2004, he received a Kennedy Center Honor. He won a Classic Brit Award in 2005 for his soundtrack work of the previous year. Williams has won the Grammy Award for Best Instrumental Composition for his scores for Star Wars, Close Encounters of the Third Kind, Superman, The Empire Strikes Back, E.T. the Extra-Terrestrial, Angela's Ashes, Munich, Indiana Jones and the Kingdom of the Crystal Skull, and The Book Thief. The competition includes not only composers of film scores, but also composers of instrumental music of any genre, including composers of classical fare such as symphonies and chamber music.

In 2003, the International Olympic Committee accorded Williams its highest individual honor, the Olympic Order. In 2009, Williams received the National Medal of Arts in the White House in Washington, D.C., for his achievements in symphonic music for films, and "as a pre-eminent composer and conductor [whose] scores have defined and inspired modern movie-going for decades". In 2012, Williams received the Brit Award for Outstanding Contribution to Music. In 2013, Williams was presented with the Ken Burns Lifetime Achievement Award. In 2016, Williams was made a Chevalier De L'Ordre des Arts et des Lettres – Government of France In 2018, the performing rights organization Broadcast Music, Inc. established The John Williams Award, of which Williams became the first recipient. Also the same year, Williams received the Grammy Trustees Award which is a Special Merit Award presented to individuals who, during their careers in music, have made significant contributions, other than performance (and some performers through 1983), to the field of recording. In 2020, Williams won the Grammy Award for "Best Instrumental Composition" for composing Star Wars: Galaxy's Edge Symphonic Suite, and he received his 52nd Oscar nomination for "Best Original Score" at the 92nd Academy Awards for Star Wars: The Rise of Skywalker. In 2020, Williams received the Gold Medal of the Royal Philharmonic Society as well as the Princess of Asturias Award for the Arts (jointly with Ennio Morricone). In 2021, Williams received an honorary degree from the University of Pennsylvania. In 2022, Williams was appointed an Honorary Knight Commander of the Order of the British Empire (KBE) by Queen Elizabeth II, "for services to film music", one of the final two knighthoods awarded during the Queen's seventy-year reign.

Charting hits (U.S., Billboard)

Concert works

Concertos
1969: Concerto for Flute and Orchestra
1976: Concerto for Violin and Orchestra
1985: Concerto for Tuba and Orchestra
1991: Concerto for Clarinet and Orchestra
1993: Concerto for Bassoon and Orchestra, The Five Sacred Trees
1994: Concerto for Cello and Orchestra
1996: Concerto for Trumpet and Orchestra
1997: Elegy for Cello and Orchestra
2000: TreeSong for Violin and Orchestra
2002: Heartwood: Lyric Sketches for Cello and Orchestra
2002: Escapades for Alto Saxophone and Orchestra (adapted from the Catch Me If You Can film score)
2003: Concerto for Horn and Orchestra
2009: Concerto for Viola and Orchestra
2009: On Willows and Birches, for Harp and Orchestra
2011: Concerto for Oboe and Orchestra
2014: Scherzo for Piano and Orchestra
2017: Markings for Violin, Strings and Harp
2018: Highwood's Ghost, An Encounter for Cello, Harp and Orchestra
2021: Second Violin Concerto

Other orchestral works
1965: Prelude and Fugue (recorded on Stan Kenton Conducts the Los Angeles Neophonic Orchestra (Capitol, 1965))
1965: Symphony No. 1
1965: Essay for Strings
1968: Sinfonietta for Wind Ensemble
1975: Thomas and the King – Musical
1980: Jubilee 350 Fanfare
1984: Olympic Fanfare & Theme
1986: Liberty Fanfare
1987: A Hymn to New England
1988: Fanfare for Michael Dukakis
1988: For New York
1990: Celebrate Discovery
1993: Sound the Bells!
1994: Song for World Peace
1995: Variations on Happy Birthday
1999: American Journey
2003: Soundings
2007: Star Spangled Banner
2008: A Timeless Call
2012: Fanfare for Fenway
2012: Seven for Luck for soprano and orchestra
2013: For 'The President's Own'
2014: Star Spangled Banner

Chamber works
1951: Sonata for Piano
1997: Elegy for Cello and Piano
2001: Three Pieces for Solo Cello
2007: Duo Concertante for Violin and Viola
2009: Air and Simple Gifts for violin, cello, clarinet and piano
2011: Quartet La Jolla for violin, cello, clarinet and harp
2012: Rounds for solo guitar
2013: Conversations for solo Piano
2014: Music for Brass for Brass Ensemble and Percussion

Discography

See also 
List of compositions by John Williams
Music of Star Wars
Music of Superman
Music of Harry Potter

References

Further reading 
 
 Audissino, Emilio (2021): John Williams's Film Music: Reviving Hollywood's Classical Style. (Madison, WI: University of Wisconsin Press), 376 pp. .
 Audissino, Emilio ed. (2018): John Williams: Music for Films, Television and the Concert Stage. (Lucca, Italy: Bepols), 440 pp. .
 
 Paulus, Irena: "Williams versus Wagner – Or an Attempt at Linking Musical Epics". In: .
 Stoppe, Sebastian: "John Williams's Film Music in the Concert Halls". In: 
 Valverde, Andrés (2013). John Williams: Vida y Obra . Berenice Press. .

External links

 
 
 

 
1932 births
20th-century American composers
20th-century American conductors (music)
20th-century American male musicians
20th-century American pianists
20th-century classical composers
20th-century classical pianists
20th-century jazz composers
21st-century American composers
21st-century American conductors (music)
21st-century American male musicians
21st-century American pianists
21st-century classical composers
21st-century classical pianists
21st-century jazz composers
AFI Life Achievement Award recipients
American classical composers
American classical pianists
American contemporary classical composers
American film score composers
American jazz composers
American jazz pianists
American male classical composers
American male classical pianists
American male conductors (music)
American male film score composers
American male jazz composers
American male jazz pianists
American music arrangers
American television composers
Animated film score composers
Annie Award winners
Atlantic Records artists
Best Original Music BAFTA Award winners
Best Original Music Score Academy Award winners
Brit Award winners
CBS Records artists
Classical musicians from New York (state)
Columbia Records artists
Composers for piano
Composers from New York City
Concert band composers
Decca Records artists
Deutsche Grammophon artists
DreamWorks Records artists
Edison Classical Music Awards Oeuvreprijs winners
Golden Globe Award-winning musicians
Grammy Award winners
Hollywood Records artists
Honorary Knights Commander of the Order of the British Empire
Honorary Members of the Royal Academy of Music
Jazz-influenced classical composers
Jazz musicians from New York (state)
Juilliard School alumni
Kennedy Center honorees
Living people
Male television composers
MCA Records artists
Military personnel from New York City
Musicians from New York City
Musicians from Queens, New York
North Hollywood High School alumni
People from Floral Park, New York
People from Flushing, Queens
Primetime Emmy Award winners
Recipients of the Olympic Order
Sony Classical Records artists
UCLA School of the Arts and Architecture alumni
United States Air Force airmen
United States National Medal of Arts recipients
Musicians awarded knighthoods
Composers awarded knighthoods